Little green men are a stereotypical portrayal of extraterrestrials as little humanoid-like creatures with green skin and antennae on their heads.

Little Green Men may also refer to:
 Little green men (Russo-Ukrainian War), Russian irregular forces in Ukraine
 Little Green Men (Toy Story), alien race in Toy Story
 "Little Green Men" (Star Trek: Deep Space Nine), a 1995 (fourth-season) episode of Star Trek: Deep Space Nine
 "Little Green Men" (The X-Files), second-season episode of The X-Files
 The Little Green Man, a British animated cartoon series
 Little Green Men (novel), by comic novelist Christopher Buckley
 Little Green Men Games, a Croatian video game developer
 LGM-1, for "Little Green Men 1", nickname for the first radio pulsar discovered
 "Little Green Men", a track from Steve Vai's debut album Flex-Able
 Enanitos Verdes (Spanish for "Little Green Men"), Argentine rock band
 Xiaolüren (Chinese for "Little Green Men"), the animated traffic light system in Taiwan
 Elgyem, a Pokémon species based on little green men ("LGM") in its design, characteristics, and name

See also
 Green Man (disambiguation)